Nancova is a municipality of the province of Cuando Cubango, in Angola. The population is 2,796 in 2014 in an area of 10,310 km. The municipality consists of the communes Nancova and Rito.

References

Municipalities of Angola
Populated places in Cuando Cubango Province